BBC Scotland Investigates is a current affairs programme broadcast in Scotland by BBC Scotland. It is broadcast regularly on BBC One Scotland on weekday nights, currently with varying timeslots.

Previously known as Frontline Scotland, the programme usually features current issues affecting the Scottish people. Most recent examples include gang warfare in Glasgow, problems with the NHS, the likely effects of increased gambling in Scottish cities and North Sea oil.

BBC Scotland Investigates' reporters include Samantha Poling and Ross McWilliam.

In most cases, the entire programme is devoted to one topic, and consists entirely of an in-depth documentary piece from a single reporter (similar to the BBC's Panorama programme).

The programme is also available on the Internet from the BBC Scotland website, with episodes dating back to 2004 available to watch online.

See also
 Television in Scotland

External links

BBC Scotland television shows
Scottish society
Politics of Scotland
Current affairs shows
1993 Scottish television series debuts
1990s Scottish television series
2000s Scottish television series
2010s Scottish television series
2020s Scottish television series